Saint-Simon is a settlement in Gloucester County, New Brunswick, Canada. It is located in the Acadian Peninsula.

Saint-Simon is primarily a francophone community.

History

Education
Since the closure of the École Lorette-Doiron, French-speaking students benefit from schools in Caraquet. The town of Shippagan is home to the CCNB-Péninsule acadienne campus of the Université de Moncton.

English-speaking people have a school in Brantville which welcomes students from kindergarten to eighth grade. They must then continue their studies in Miramichi. The closest English higher education institutions are in Fredericton, the provincial capital, or Miramichi.

There is a public library in Caraquet. However, the Bookmobile North makes a stop in the village.

Notable people

See also

List of communities in New Brunswick

References

Local service districts of Gloucester County, New Brunswick
Communities in Gloucester County, New Brunswick